The Australian Women's Party was a minor Australian feminist party that was first registered with the Australian Electoral Commission on 19 December 1995 and was deregistered on 22 April 2003. Its main platform consisted of a constitutional alteration to ensure equal representation of men and women at all levels of government, included in the republic debate.

In 2018, The Women's Party, a new political party, distinct from the original Australian Women's Party, was formed which gained formal registration as a political party from the Australian Electoral Commission on 20 February 2019.

See also

Feminism in Australia
Politics of Australia

References

1995 establishments in Australia
2003 disestablishments in Australia
Defunct political parties in Australia
Feminist organisations in Australia
Feminist parties
Political parties established in 1995
Political parties disestablished in 2003